Securly, Inc. is an American company based in San Jose, California and incorporated in Delaware. It develops and sells internet filters, spyware, and other technologies which primary and secondary schools use to monitor students' web browsing, web searches, video watching, social media posts, emails, online documents, and drives. It was founded in 2013.

Reception 

Securly has been criticized for providing tools that empower schools to censor content and invade students' privacy. In 2017, the Milwaukee Journal Sentinel reported on Arrowhead High School's implementation of Securly, which received pushback from parents and students. The software monitored activity of school-owned equipment, but also of students' own devices that connected to the school's Wi-Fi. Points of contention included the risk of Securly being hacked, the potential sale of students' browsing and search history to insurance companies and advertisers, and general privacy concerns. Securly stated that they "monitor students' internet searches and social media posts; flag them for references that suggest such things as drug use, cyberbullying or suicide; and share students' internet browsing histories with parents who want them". Common Sense Media director Girard Kelly said events like the Cambridge Analytica scandal and the Equifax data breach show the need to protect students' data, arguing Securly does the opposite by normalizing a "surveillance state" where students have to give up their data without their consent. 

Securly says that its service allows schools to achieve compliance with state and federal requirements such as the Children's Internet Protection Act (CIPA). Securly has claimed its services help prevent school shootings, but it has been criticized for not providing data that supports this claim.

References

External links 
 

Content-control software
Internet safety
Educational technology companies of the United States
Organizations based in California
Organizations established in 2012
2012 establishments in California